Biskupija is a village and municipality in Šibenik-Knin County, Croatia. The seat of the municipality is the village of Orlić.

Etymology 
The word Biskupija in Croatian means diocese, referring to the former estate and seat of Croatian bishops in this area. The place was also known as Kosovo from 11th til 18th century, after the Kosovo field. Kosovo is still used as name for the train station located in the municipality.

Geography
The municipality covers a karst field called Kosovo field located between the mountains of Promina and Veliki Kozjak. The village of Biskupija itself is located in the north of the municipality, just south of Knin.
The D33 and D1 state roads and the Zagreb-Split railway pass through the municipality.

Languages
Along with Croatian which is official in the whole country, Serbian language and Serbian Cyrillic alphabet are co-official on the territory of municipality.

History and culture
The shrine of Our Lady of Biskupija, or St. Mary of Croatia, is situated in the village of Biskupija, 5 km southeast of Knin, the former church and cultural centre of the Croatian state in the Middle Ages. Archaeologists have discovered the foundations of five churches in that village, dating from the period of Croatian rulers from the 9th to the 11th century. St. Mary's church was the residence of the Bishop of Knin, who was Bishop of Croatia from 1040 to 1522. The earliest known figure of Our Lady in Croatian art was discovered by archaeologists in that same church on a part of the stone partition wall, which separated the shrine from the church nave. It is still venerated as Our Lady of the Great Croatian Vow.

Today, on the foundations of the old Croatian church of the same name there stands a memorial church, decorated between 1937 and 1938 according to the designs of Croatia’s most famous sculptor, Ivan Meštrović. The church is a single-nave building (16 x 8.4 m) with a square niche for the altar, and a 12.5 metre-tall steeple before it. Ivan Meštrović also created the statue of Our Lady, depicting a Mother wearing a folk costume from Dalmatian Hinterland, with a child on her lap, and who is writing the book of life. Regrettably, however, the statue was destroyed by Serbian rebels. Above the niche containing the main altar the renowned Croatian artist, Jozo Kljaković, painted the fresco "King Zvonimir holding Court", which was also riddled by bullets fired by Serbian extremists. The church was thoroughly refurbished in 1966, when Meštrović's statue was restored. Since then, the main pilgrimage occurs on the last Sunday in September, when the Holy Virgin’s name is honoured. The church was once again destroyed during the Croatian War of Independence, and now awaits rebuilding.

Demographics
There are a total of 1,699 inhabitants in the municipality: 1,452 Serbs, 231 Croats and 16 others. By mother tongue, there are 589 Croatian speakers, 417 Serbian speakers, 687 speakers of Serbo-Croatian and 6 speakers of other languages.

Settlements
The municipality consists of following settlements:
 Biskupija - population 406
 Markovac - pop. 63
 Orlić - pop. 302
 Ramljane - pop. 118
 Riđane - pop. 67
 Uzdolje - pop. 226
 Vrbnik - pop. 447
 Zvjerinac - pop. 70

See also

 Knin

References

External links
 https://web.archive.org/web/20061007063030/http://www.croatia.hr/English/TurizamPlus/Aktivnost.aspx?idActivity=11&idOrder=1

Municipalities of Croatia
Populated places in Šibenik-Knin County

it:Vescovia